C9TV (Channel 9 Television) was a local television station based in Derry, Northern Ireland. The station's licences were awarded by the ITC (now Ofcom) in 1996 and allow the station to broadcast to Derry, Limavady, Coleraine and Strabane. The channels signal also spills into County Donegal in the Republic and can be picked up in the northeast of the county. Along with Belfast's NvTv, C9TV was one of two local or 'restricted' television services in Northern Ireland.

Output
C9TV produces local programming – some of its most popular output being the news and current affairs programmes. Alongside news and current affairs, the station also broadcasts a number of hours of Sky News every day. Music videos also make up a portion of the stations daily output. The station started in 1999 with Channel 9 News with Jimmy Cadden he continued to 2005 when he was replaced by Teresa Craig. It broadcast many local programmes such as Agenda, Local Matters, Galligan, A morning program which went around local schools and the news at 6 pm & 9 pm and the Sport was presented by Felix Healy. It also covered local events live such as the Relief of Derry Celebrations, the Remembrance Day Services and many others. It broadcast Sky News at 11 am, 2 pm and 5 pm with Local Infochannel and music overnight. As the channel went on fewer local programmes were produced from about 2005 when it just showed Music Videoes and the local news as well as Sky News and in 2007 it just broadcast Sky News for 24 hours until it finally went off air in 2009 with a whimper.

Identity
While most RSL local stations in the UK refer to themselves as "Channel 6" or "Six" or similar, the number 9 reflects the large number of stations receivable in the area. All 5 UK-wide services can be picked up in C9TV's transmission area, although Five coverage via analogue was weak in some parts. The Republic of Ireland's four channels can be picked up (from the Holywell Hill transmitter outside Letterkenny at high power), although only 3 had launched when C9TV was being conceived (though not by the time it had launched), resulting in the channel getting ninth place.

Ownership
In October 2008, C9TV was brought by businessman Alan Cummings and was due to be relaunched with a further ten staff due to be employed at the station. It was announced that the station was to be located at Magee University of Ulster, with local news and students being involved in the production and presenting of programmes.

Planned relaunch and axe
In 2007, the station ceased all local programming production, replacing much of the station's transmission time with further simulcasts of Sky News. Until the planned relaunch of C9TV, the station has ceased transmission in 2009. The C9TV website was relaunched the day after Cummings bought the station saying 'Coming Soon' but soon the website domain was taken down and since it has transpired the relaunch has been abandoned and will no longer return to Derry as of 2012.

See also
List of British television channels

References

External links
Official site

Mass media in County Donegal
Mass media in Derry (city)
RSL television channels
Television channels and stations established in 1999
Television channels and stations disestablished in 2009
Television in Northern Ireland
Local television channels in the United Kingdom
1999 establishments in Northern Ireland